Associated Students, Chico (AS.) is the student government at California State University, Chico.  With assets of over $19 million and annual revenue over $20 million, Associated Students, Chico is one of the largest non-profit organizations in Northern California Associated Students, Chico is a 501(c)(3) nonprofit public-benefit corporation with 17,488 members. The organization owns and operates several student services on-campus including all vending machines, and foodservices, as well as the campus bookstore. The students of CSU Chico also own their own student union building named the Bell Memorial Union which houses the Marketplace Cafe, the AS Bookstore, and the student government offices.

The Associated Students Bylaws provide that student officers are elected annually from among and by the students. Students are assessed a mandatory Activity Fee at registration which funds the student government and other programs.

The AS. is generally divided into three areas, each the responsibility of one of three Associated Students standing committees. The AS' role as a government is manifested in the Government Affairs Committee. The student union is administered under the original authority of the Bell Memorial Union Committee. The administration of the businesses is under the original authority of the Business Committee. All of these areas are under the ultimate authority of the AS Board of Directors.

Associated Students, Chico is a dues paying member of the California State Student Association, the Auxiliary Organizations Association, and the Association of College Unions International
.

Board of directors
The Associated Students Board of Directors is composed of
the four elected student executives, the two elected student directors, one faculty member jointly appointed by the AS and the university president, and two university vice presidents. All activity of the organization is ultimately under the direction of the board. Any action of any of the three standing committees of the board may be overturned only by a 2/3+1 vote of the board.

Student government
The students of CSUC are represented on campus and in the community by the student government. The AS President is elected annually and generally supervises all elected and appointed officers. The Government Affairs Committee comprises the elected student officers.  In fall 2014, the Student Academic Senate was established under the Government Affairs Committee to provide for college specific representation.

Executives, Directors and Commissioners
 President, Breanna Holbert
 Executive Vice President, Jennifer Mendoza
 Vice President of Business and Finance, Austin Lapic
 Vice President of Facilities and Services, Kaylee Biedermann
 Director of University Affairs, Ella Snyder
 Director of Legislative Affairs, Anthony Ruiz
 Commissioner of Sustainability Affairs, Nick Blackwell
 Commissioner of Diversity Affairs, Logan Lee
 Commissioner of Community Affairs, Kiley Kirkpatrick
 Commissioner of Student Organizations and Resources, Vacant

Student Academic Senators
College of Engineering, Computer Science, and Construction Management, Vacant
College of Agriculture, Michelle Borges
College of Behavioral and Social Sciences, Emily Bruns
College of Business, Mattea Bertain
College of Communication and Education, Caitlin Morris
College of Humanities and Fine Arts, Taryn Burns
College of Natural Sciences, Nirvana Almada

Councils & Committees
 Government Affairs Committee
 Bell Memorial Union Committee
 Associated Students Business Committee
 Sustainability Fund Allocation Committee
 Student Academic Senate
 Legislative Affairs Committee
 Sustainability Affairs Council
 Community Affairs Council
 Diversity Affairs Council
 Town & Gown Committee
 Event and Diversity Programming Allocation Council

Activity Fee funded programs
 Child Development Lab
 Gender and Sexuality Equity Coalition 
 Community Legal Information Clinic
 KCSC Radio
 Community Action Volunteers in Education (CAVE)
 AS Productions
 AS Sustainability
 AS Recycling
Freshman Leadership Opportunity(FLO)

Student union

There are several programs run by the students, under the original jurisdiction of the AS Bell Memorial Union Committee.

Recreation programs
 Adventure Outings
 Wildcat Recreation Center

Services
 Conference Services
 Information Center
 3rd Floor Art Gallery
 Computer Lab
 Facilities

Student businesses
There are several commercial enterprises run by the students, under the original jurisdiction of the AS Businesses Committee.

AS Bookstore
 Clothing/Gifts/Supplies
 Computers
 Convenience Store
 General Books
 Textbook Operations
 Shipping/Receiving
 Cashiering
 Store Systems
 E-Commerce
 Customer Service

AS Dining Services
 Butte Station
 Holt Station
 Catering
 Concessions/Vending
 Residence Hall Dining
 Common Grounds
 Creekside Coffee
 Union Marketplace Café

Organizational administration
 Financial Services
 Human Resources
 Information Technology

External links
AS. Chico website

References

This article uses Creative Commons licensed material from Chico Wiki

California State University, Chico
California State University auxiliary organizations
Student governments in the United States
Student organizations in California